Francisco Moreno Zuleta (August 4, 1880 - July 3, 1963) was a Spanish lawyer, politician and minister of National Economy during the dictatorship of Primo de Rivera.

References

Economy and finance ministers of Spain
People from Jerez de la Frontera
1880 births
1963 deaths